Raymond Clyne McNichols (June 16, 1914 – December 25, 1985) was a United States district judge of the United States District Court for the District of Idaho.

Education and career

Born in Bonners Ferry, Idaho, and raised in Lewiston, McNichols served in the United States Navy during World War II, from 1942 to 1947, under Raymond A. Spruance. He attended the University of Idaho in Moscow and received a Bachelor of Laws from its College of Law in 1950. He was in private practice in Orofino in Clearwater County, Idaho from 1950 to 1964. He was a member of the Democratic Party.

Federal judicial service

On April 15, 1964, McNichols was nominated by President Lyndon B. Johnson to a seat on the United States District Court for the District of Idaho vacated by the retirement of Judge Chase A. Clark. He was confirmed by the United States Senate on April 30 and received his commission on May 1, 1964. McNichols served as Chief Judge from 1971 to 1981, and assumed senior status on July 1, 1981, and served in that capacity for over four years, until his death.

Family

McNichols' younger brother Robert James McNichols (1922–1992) was also a federal judge, in Spokane, Washington. During Robert's investiture to the federal bench in January 1980, the elder brother swore the younger in.

Death

McNichols suffered a heart attack at his Boise home on Christmas Day in 1985, and died at age 71 at St. Luke's Regional Medical Center in Boise. He and his wife, Mary Kay Riley McNichols (1914–1991), are buried at Morris Hill Cemetery in Boise. They had two children.

References

External links
 
 

Judges of the United States District Court for the District of Idaho
United States district court judges appointed by Lyndon B. Johnson
20th-century American judges
United States Navy personnel of World War II
University of Idaho alumni
Idaho lawyers
People from Orofino, Idaho
People from Bonners Ferry, Idaho
1914 births
1985 deaths
People from Lewiston, Idaho
Military personnel from Idaho
University of Idaho College of Law alumni